Falklandoglenes is a genus of South American dwarf spiders that was first described by M. B. Usher in 1983.

Species 
 it contains four species, all found in the Falkland Islands:

 Falklandoglenes hadassa Lavery & Snazell, 2023 – Falkland Is.
 Falklandoglenes iasonum Lavery & Snazell, 2023 – Falkland Is.
 Falklandoglenes spinosa Usher, 1983 (type) – Falkland Is.
 Falklandoglenes weddelli Lavery & Snazell, 2023 – Falkland Is.

See also
 List of Linyphiidae species (A–H)

References

Linyphiidae
Spiders of South America